Agastheeswaram Agastheeswarar Temple (அகத்தீச்சுரம் அகத்தீசுவரர் கோயில்) is a Hindu temple located at Vadugan Patru  in Kanyakumari district of Tamil Nadu, India. The presiding deity is Shiva. He is called as Agastheeswarar. His consort is known as Amuthavalli.

Location 
This temple is located at about 100 metres from Vadugan Patru bus stop, 1 km from Kottaram and 5 km from Kanyakumari.

Significance 
It is one of the shrines of the Vaippu Sthalams sung by Tamil Saivite Nayanar Appar. Appar and Sage Agasthia with his wife Lopamudra worshipped the presiding deity of the temple.

Another Agastheeswarar Temple
There is another  temple in the name of Agastheeswar Temple dedicated to Shiva, in the town of Agathiyampalli, Nagapattinam district in Tamil Nadu, India.

References

External links 
 Muvar Thevara Vaippu Thalangal, மூவர் தேவார வைப்புத்தலங்கள், agaththIccuram, Sl.No.2 of 139 temples
 Shiva Temples, தேவார வைப்புத் தலங்கள், அகத்திச்சுரம், Sl.No.1 of 133 temples, page1

Hindu temples in Kanyakumari district